Tanjong Karang or Tanjung Karang may refer to:
Tanjong Karang
Tanjong Karang (federal constituency), represented in the Dewan Rakyat
Tanjong Karang (state constituency), formerly represented in the Selangor State Legislative Assembly (1959–74)